Xanthomyia alpestris is a species of tephritid or fruit flies in the genus Xanthomyia of the family Tephritidae.

Distribution
Finland, Russia, Kazakhstan, Mongolia, China.

References

Tephritinae
Insects described in 1887
Diptera of Europe
Diptera of Asia